Alexander Maurice Ramsay (1914–1978) was a public servant, teacher, and 25-year General Manager of the South Australian Housing Trust.

Early life
Ramsay was born on 27 October 1914, in Parkside, a suburb of Adelaide, South Australia.

References
"Ramsay, Alexander Maurice (1914–1978)", Australian Dictionary of Biography

1914 births
1978 deaths
People from Adelaide